Lewistown is the name of several places in the United States of America:
Lewiston, Idaho
Lewistown, Illinois
Lewistown, Kentucky
Lewiston, Maine, originally called Lewistown
Lewistown, Frederick County, Maryland
Lewistown, Talbot County, Maryland
Lewistown, Missouri
Lewistown, Montana
Lewistown, Ohio
Lewistown, Pennsylvania

Lewistown is also the name of a place in Wales, in the United Kingdom:

Lewistown, Bridgend

See also
Lewiston (disambiguation)